On 6 September 2011, Aerocon Flight 238, a Fairchild Metro III regional passenger aircraft on a service from Santa Cruz de la Sierra to Trinidad, Bolivia, crashed on approach to Trinidad, killing eight of the nine people on board.

Accident
The aircraft had taken off from El Trompillo Airport, Santa Cruz de la Sierra, for its hour-long,  flight to Trinidad.

A search by the Bolivian Air Force was initiated. Initial reports stated that there were no survivors.

Helicopters reached the crash site at 16:40 local time and it was discovered that eight of the nine people on board the aircraft had been killed in the crash. The survivor was discovered at around 09:00 local time on 9 September, having walked away from the wreckage in search of help. He sustained a head wound and severe bruising but did not have any broken bones. He was airlifted to a hospital.

A minute's silence was held in the Senate of Bolivia in memory of those who were killed.

Aircraft
The aircraft involved was Fairchild SA227-BC Metro III, registration CP-2548, c/n BC-768B. The aircraft had first flown in 1992 and had served with several airlines before its sale to Aerocon in January 2009.

Investigation
Bolivia's Directorate General of Civil Aviation opened an investigation into the accident. The cockpit voice recorder and flight data recorder were recovered from the wreckage and sent to Brazil for analysis.

It was reported that a required VOR radio beacon had been out of service since 20 August and that the crew was attempting a non-precision approach  at the time of the accident.

References

Aviation accidents and incidents in 2011
Aviation accidents and incidents in Bolivia
2011 in Bolivia
Accidents and incidents involving the Fairchild Swearingen Metroliner
Trinidad, Bolivia
September 2011 events in South America
2011 disasters in Bolivia